This article gives a list of various almanacs. Note that almanac can also be spelled almanack, and some of the publications listed use this form.

Wikipedia almanac-type data 

 List of reference tables

Printed almanacs 
  Barbanera Almanac (1762–present)
Canadian Almanac & Directory, Grey House Publishing Canada, a comprehensive resource
 Canadian Global Almanac (1992–2005), a book of facts about Canada and the world
 Deventer Almanak
 Encyclopædia Britannica Almanac (not the Yearbook, which is an annual update to the multi-volume encyclopedia; the almanac is a standalone publication)
 Enkhuizer Almanak (founded in 1595, and the oldest known copy of it dates back to 1596)
 Farmers' Almanac (1818–present)
 Kalnirnay  – the world's largest yearly published almanac (1973–present)  
 The New York Times Almanac (1969–2011)
 Nieropper Almanak
 O Verdadeiro Almanaque Borda D'Água (1929–present)
 Old Farmer's Almanac (1792–present)
 Schott's Almanac
 TIME Almanac with Information Please, formerly Information Please Almanac (1947–2013)
 Wall Street Journal Almanac (1998 and 1999)
 Whitaker's Almanack (1868–present)
 The World Almanac and Book of Facts (1868–1876, 1886–present)

Online almanacs 
American Almanac, a traditional almanac presented as a mobile app
Canadian Almanac & Directory, Grey House Publishing Canada, an online searchable database
 CIA World Factbook 
 Information, Please! 
 Sri Lanka Almanac Vidhyuth Koshaya

Special-purpose almanacs 
 The Almanac for Farmers & City Folk
 Almanach cracoviense ad annum 1474 (1473)
 Baer's Agricultural Almanac (1825–present)
 Blum's Farmer's and Planter's Almanac (1828–present)
 Grier's Almanac (1807–present)
 Harris' Farmer's Almanac (1692–present)
 J. Gruber's Hagerstown Town & Country Almanack (1797–present)
 Jewish Year Book (1896–present)
 Kulavruttanta (1915–present)
 Old Moore's Almanack (1699–present)
 Places Rated Almanac (1982–present)
 Poor Richard's Almanack (1733–1758)
 Thackers Indian Directory (1864–1960)
 Wisden Cricketers' Almanack (1864–present)
 Your Name Almanac (1934–present)

Astronomical almanacs
 Air Almanac 
 Astronomical Almanac
 Astronomical Phenomena 
 The Astronomical Pocket Diary (1987–present)
 Multiyear Interactive Computer Almanac 
 The Nautical Almanac (1767–present under various titles; prepared by U.S. Naval Observatory and Her Majesty's Nautical Almanac Office since 1958)
 Star Almanac for Land Surveyors

Astrological almanacs
 Panjika: name of a number of Jyotisha almanacs:
Vishuddha Siddhanta Panjika
 Gupta Press Panjika 
 Raphael's Ephemeris, W. Foulsham & Company Limited

Fictional almanacs 

Ankh-Morpork Almanack and Book of Days, from various Discworld novels (a version has been published as The Discworld Almanak)
Gray's Sports Almanac, featured in Back to the Future Part II
Klepp's Almenak, a travel guide to the islands of the Abarat from The Books of Abarat novels by Clive Barker

Almanac calculators
 Kanippayyur Shankaran Namboodiripad
 Jacob de Gelder
 Isaac Haringhuysen
 Dirck Jansz van Dam
 J. van Dam
 Jan Albertsz van Dam
 Meyndert van Dam
 Dirck Rembrantsz van Nierop
 Pieter Rembrantsz van Nierop
 Mattheus van Nispen

Satirical almanacs 

 The Areas of My Expertise (2005)

Sports almanacs 

  Athletic Almanac by Spalding Athletic Library

See also
American almanacs

References 

Almanacs

lt:Dalykinė enciklopedija